The 2012 Open GDF Suez Région Limousin was a professional tennis tournament played on indoor hard courts. It was the sixth edition of the tournament which was part of the 2012 ITF Women's Circuit. It took place in Limoges, France on 15–21 October 2012.

WTA entrants

Seeds 

 1 Rankings are as of 8 October 2012.

Other entrants 
The following players received wildcards into the singles main draw:
  Josepha Adam
  Audrey Bergot
  Alix Collombon
  Fiona Ferro

The following players received entry from the qualifying draw:
  Zuzana Luknárová
  Angelique van der Meet
  Natalia Orlova
  Constance Sibille

Champions

Singles 

  Claire Feuerstein def.  Maryna Zanevska, 7–5, 6–3

Doubles 

  Magda Linette /  Sandra Zaniewska def.  Irena Pavlovic /  Stefanie Vögele, 6–1, 5–7, [10–5]

External links 
 2012 Open GDF Suez Région Limousin at ITFTennis.com
 Official website

Open GDF Suez Region Limousin
2012 in French tennis
Open de Limoges